Nyshche (Nuszcze) is a selo, formerly a shtetl on the Strypa River, upriver from the town of Zboriv in former Galicia and now Ukraine.

It is situated in Ternopil Raion of Ternopil Oblast in western Ukraine. Nyshche belongs to Zboriv urban hromada, one of the hromadas of Ukraine. 

Until 18 July 2020, Nyshche belonged to Zboriv Raion. The raion was abolished in July 2020 as part of the administrative reform of Ukraine, which reduced the number of raions of Ternopil Oblast to three. The area of Zboriv Raion was merged into Ternopil Raion.

Notable people
 Samuel Roth (1893–1974), American anti-censorship publisher

References

Shtetls
Villages in Ternopil Raion
Historic Jewish communities in Ukraine